The 12959/12960 Bhuj Dadar Superfast Express is a Superfast Express train belonging to Indian Railways that runs between  and Mumbai in India. It is a 2 days a week service. It operates as train number 12959 from Dadar Western to Bhuj and as train number 12960 in the reverse direction.

Coaches

The 12959/60 Bhuj–Dadar Superfast Express presently has 1 AC 2 tier, 2 AC 3 tier, 6 Sleeper class & 6 General Unreserved coaches. As with most train services in India, coach composition may be amended at the discretion of Indian Railways depending on demand.

Service

The 12959/60 Bhuj–Dadar Superfast Express was first introduced on 12 November 2011. Presently it is a bi-weekly service. It operates via the newly constructed Palanpur line on the Mumbai–Bhuj route.

It covers the distance of 977 kilometres in 17 hours 45 mins as 12959 Dadar–Bhuj Superfast Express (55.04 km/hr) & 17 hours 30 mins as 12960 Bhuj–Dadar Superfast Express (55.83 km/hr). As its average speed in both directions is above 55 km/hr as per Indian Railways rules, it has a Superfast surcharge.

Traction

Dual-traction WCAM-1 OR WCAM-2/2P locos would haul the train until  after which a Vatva or Ratlam-based WDM-3A would take over until Bhuj.

As Western Railways switched over to AC system in February 2012, it is now hauled by a WAP-4 or WAP-5 engine from the Vadodara shed\ until Ahmedabad Junction, after which a Vatva or Ratlam-based WDM-3A takes over until .

It reverses direction twice on its run. These reversals occur at  &

Time Table

12960 Bhuj–Dadar Superfast Express leaves Bhuj every Monday & Thursday at 18:30 hrs IST and reaches Dadar at 12:00 hrs IST the next day.

On return, the 12959 Dadar–Bhuj Superfast Express leaves Dadar every Wednesday & Saturday at 00:05 hrs IST and reaches Bhuj at 17:45 hrs IST the same day.

External links

References 

Transport in Mumbai
Transport in Bhuj
Express trains in India
Rail transport in Gujarat
Transport in Kutch district
Rail transport in Maharashtra